Stenoptilodes phaeonephes is a moth of the family Pterophoridae. It is found in Australia, including Tasmania.

The wingspan is about 10 mm.

External links
Australian Faunal Directory
Australian Insects

Moths of Australia
phaeonephes
Moths described in 1886